The Pincheira brothers (Spanish: Hermanos Pincheira) was an infamous royalist outlaw group in Chile and Argentina active from 1818 to 1832. The gang fought initially in the Chilean War of Independence as royalist guerrillas during the Guerra a muerte phase. After Vicente Benavides was executed and the royalist resistance collapsed, they became armed bandits who sought to live outside the new states of Chile and Argentina. Later they specialized in cattle raiding and robbery. The Pincheira brothers formed an alliance with the Boroanos tribe that had settled in Salinas Grandes and Sierra de la Ventana and attacked with them Carmen de Patagones and Fortaleza Protectora Argentina (today's Bahia Blanca). As such they were a multiethnic group.

In 1827 the colonel Jorge Beauchef, under the orders of Chilean general Manuel Bulnes, crossed the Andes and defeated the Pincheira brothers in the battle of Epulafquén, but the outlaws slipped away. The gang was at large until 1832 when José Antonio Pincheira, who was in exile in Mendoza, negotiated a capitulation to the government of Chile.

A significant folklore has grown around the Cueva de los Pincheira, a hideout of the gang.

References

Chilean outlaws
Chilean War of Independence
Gangs in Argentina
Sibling groups
History of Ñuble Region